The Others is the debut studio album by Australian music collective Dukes of Windsor, released on 2 September 2006.

Track listing

Release history

References

Dukes of Windsor albums
2006 albums